Tonina fluviatilis is a  plant species in the Eriocaulaceae. It is the sole species in the monotypic genus Tonina, native to southern Mexico, Central America, northern South America (Colombia, Venezuela, Ecuador, Peru, northern Brazil, and the Guianas), Cuba and Trinidad.

One use of the plant is for medicinal purposes. The plant is ground up and mixed with a bark to make a liquid in which to bathe nursing infants. It is thought to give the infant strength.

It is also used as an aquarium plant. The shape of its leaf is pleasing and its color makes a good contrast with other plants when it is planted in small groups. However, it is difficult to grow as an aquarium plant.

References

External links
Biological Diversity of the Guiana 
Smithsonian Plant Collections, Guyana 

Aquatic plants
Eriocaulaceae
Flora of South America
Flora of the Caribbean
Flora of Central America
Flora of Mexico

Plants described in 1775
Flora without expected TNC conservation status